The Chilean player Paul Capdeville was the defending champion. However, he was eliminated by Benjamin Balleret in the first round.

Kei Nishikori, who received a wildcard into the singles main draw, won this tournament. He defeated Kevin Kim, Benjamin Balleret, Brian Dabul, Alex Bogomolov Jr. and Robert Kendrick 6–3, 7–6(4) in the final.

Seeds

Draw

Finals

Top half

Bottom half

References
 Official website
 Main Draw
 Qualifying Draw

Singles